The Killing of Two Lovers is an 2020 American drama film, written, directed, produced, and edited by Robert Machoian. It stars Clayne Crawford, Sepideh Moafi, Chris Coy, Avery Pizzuto, Arri Graham and Ezra Graham.

It had its world premiere at the Sundance Film Festival on January 27, 2020. It was released on May 14, 2021, by Neon.

Plot
David is a father of four in a rural Utah town who is currently separated from his wife Nikki. They have agreed to see other people during this period, and Nikki has begun a relationship with her co-worker Derek. One morning, David finds the two sleeping in their bed and contemplates killing them both with his gun, but cannot go through with it, and instead runs back to his widowed father's home where he is currently staying. He then drives off to follow Derek in his truck with the intention to kill him, but stops when he receives a message from Nikki to take his three sons Alex, Theo, and Bug to the bus stop for school. David and Nikki's relationship appears amicable; they speak about the separation and how their eldest daughter Jess appears to be reacting the most negatively to it. After seeing his sons off, he finds Jess playing truant and takes her to drop her back off at school. Before leaving, Jess, unaware that he already knows, discloses that Nikki is "cheating" on him. David tries to explain that they allowed themselves to seek other partners, but Jess accuses him of not fighting hard enough to keep the family together.

He then goes off to do work for family friend and widow Mrs. Staples, who shares her feelings towards his dad, though David implies that he's not interested in that kind of relationship. He then asks about her relationship with her late husband, and she says it wasn't a particularly happy one, but they still worked through it together in spite of a lack of real love, and that she thinks he and Nikki will work through their relationship as well. Later that week, David and Nikki are about to go on a date, but after receiving a message on her phone, she asks to cut it short, claiming she's nervous about Jess looking after her brothers in her state of mind. After an awkward bout of silence as they choose to drive around the block, they have a conversation about their future post-separation and the possibility of David finding his own place to live. They then talk about their careers, where David is revealed to be a washed-up rock artist and Nikki is currently considering a future in law. As he sings her a song he wrote alluding to his feelings about their separation, the two notice Derek arriving at their house to take her on a date, but an incensed Jess wards him off. David tries to appear supportive of her relationship, but Nikki can sense his disappointment and returns to their house. Returning to his father's house, David has an emotional outburst where he physically lashes out at a Body Opponent Bag.

David returns to his house around 2:00 in the morning to talk with Theo and Alex, where he struggles to bond over the comedy of Mitch Hedberg. Later, Nikki confronts David about his visit, where she accuses him of confusing their kids about their future as a family. This leads to a heated argument in which David expresses his wishes to get to see his children while Nikki speaks on her struggles to maintain some normalcy within the family. He then drives off with his B.O.B. and takes it to an open field where he uses it for target practice with his gun.

David goes to a hobby store and purchases model rockets for his children to fire off as a bonding experience before they spend the weekend with him. The outing turns sour when Jess's rocket fails to launch, and in her frustration, she explodes on him over his unwillingness to mend his marriage; David consoles her before taking his children back home. There, Nikki reveals to David that she refused to allow Jess to go to a concert with her friends so that she could spend time with him, but David explains his fears that Jess will begin blaming him for not getting to live her life. Their argument is overheard by Derek, who has come to spend the weekend with Nikki. David becomes angered when Derek refers to Nikki as his girlfriend and becomes increasingly confrontational with him. As Nikki leaves them alone to check on her children, Derek brutally beats David and tells him he doesn't deserve her before going inside. Nikki tries to stop a bruised and bloodied David as he drives off, sobbing and delirious. After stopping in a field, he believes he sees Derek leaving his truck and approaching him. David exits his truck and begins firing his gun, not realizing that it is actually Nikki. She cradles him in her arms as he cries, the two telling each other that they love each other.

Sometime later, David, Nikki, and their children go shopping for appliances at a hardware store holding a liquidation sale. While all involved (including Jess) appear happy altogether, the ultimate fate of David and Nikki's relationship remains unknown.

Cast
 Clayne Crawford as David
 Sepideh Moafi as Nikki
 Chris Coy as Derek
 Avery Pizzuto as Jess
 Arri Graham as Alex
 Ezra Graham as Theo

Release
The film had its world premiere at the Sundance Film Festival on January 27, 2020. In October 2020, Neon acquired distribution rights to the film, and set it for a May 14, 2021, release.

Critical reception
The film received critical acclaim. The site's critical consensus reads, "The Killing of Two Lovers unites deft direction and an artfully assembled cast in service of a powerful story." According to Metacritic, which sampled 22 critics and calculated a weighted average score of 83 out of 100, indicating "universal acclaim".

References

External links
 
 

2020 films
American drama films
American independent films
Neon (distributor) films
2020 drama films
2020 independent films
2020s English-language films
2020s American films